The 2009–10 Liga Bet season was the first season since the 1998–99 Liga Bet season, in which Liga Bet regained its status as the fourth tier of Israeli football, due to the closure of Liga Artzit.

Ahi Acre (champions of the North A division), Hapoel Daliyat al-Karmel (champions of the North B division), Maccabi Kabilio Jaffa (champions of the South A division) and Bnei Eilat (champions of the South B division) won the title and promotion to Liga Alef.

The clubs ranked 2nd to 5th in each division entered a promotion play-off, at the end of which, in the North section Hapoel Ramot Menashe Megido won against Hapoel Bnei Jadeidi from Liga Alef North and was promoted to Liga Alef, while in the South section, Ironi Ramla lost to Shimshon Bnei Tayibe from Liga Alef South and failed to gain promotion.

At the bottom, Hapoel Halat el-Sharif Tamra (from North A division), Hapoel Bnei Musmus/Ma'ale Iron (from North B division), Hapoel Ramat Israel (from South A division) and Hapoel Tirat Shalom (from South B division) all finished bottom and were all automatically relegated to Liga Gimel.

The clubs ranked 12th to 15th in each division entered a relegation play-off, at the end of which Maccabi Kabul (from North A division), Beitar Ihud Mashhad (from North B division), Otzma F.C. Holon (from South A division) and Maccabi Be'er Ya'akov (from South B division) dropped to Liga Gimel as well.

Changes from last season

Format changes
 Promotion play-offs were re-introduced. Clubs ranked 2nd to 5th entered the play-offs, playing each other (2nd against 5th and 3rd against 4th) in the first round, and the winners battling each other in the second round. In the third round the North A and North B winners played each other, as well as the South A and South B winners, each winner then playing the 14th ranked club in Liga Alef for a spot in next season's Liga Alef.
 Relegation play-offs were introduced. Clubs ranked 12th to 15th entered the play-offs, first playing each other (12th against 15th and 13th against 14th), and then both matches' losers facing each other, with the losing team in this match dropping to Liga Gimel.

Team changes

To/from Liga Alef 
 Maccabi Ironi Jatt, Maccabi Umm al-Fahm, Shimshon Bnei Tayibe and Tzafririm Holon won their divisions the previous season were promoted to Liga Alef, along with best runner-up, Amishav Petah Tikva.
 Beitar Ihud Mashhad (to North B division) and Ironi Ramla (to South B division) were relegated from Liga Alef to Liga Bet.

Intra-divisional movements
 The North division were re-aligned again, moving Beitar Haifa, Maccabi Sektzia Ma'alot-Tarshiha, Maccabi Kafr Sumei, F.C. Ahva Kafr Manda, Hapoel Halat el-Sharif Tamra, Maccabi Kabul and Hapoel Nahariya from North B to North A, while Hapoel Iksal, Hapoel Isfiya, Hapoel Ar'ara and Hapoel Ramot Menashe Megido were moved from North A to North B.
 Hapoel Kvalim Mesilot changed its name to Hapoel Beit She'an/Mesilot, and was moved from North A division to North B division.

Merging and folding clubs
 Hapoel Karmiel merged with Beitar Safed from Liga Alef to form F.C. Karmiel Safed, which took Beitar Safed's place in Liga Alef.
 Bnei Abu Snan, which was relegated at the end of the previous season, folded.

To/from Liga Gimel
 Beitar Kafr Kana, Maccabi Sha'ab, Hapoel Deir el-Asad, Maccabi Or Yehuda, Hapoel Hod HaSharon, Hapoel F.C. Hevel Modi'in and Hapoel Jaljulia finished bottom and were relegated to Liga Gimel.
 Ihud Bnei Majd al-Krum and Maccabi Acre were promoted from Liga Gimel Upper Galilee to North A division.
 Maccabi Ahi Iksal, Hapoel Bnei Musmus/Ma'ale Iron (from Liga Gimel Jezreel), Maccabi Or Akiva and Bnei Jisr az-Zarqa (from Liga Gimel Shomron) were promoted to North B division
 Hapoel Bik'at HaYarden, Beitar Petah Tikva (from Liga Gimel Sharon), Hapoel Kiryat Ono and Maccabi Kabilio Jaffa (from Liga Gimel Tel Aviv) were promoted to South A division.
 Hapoel Rahat and F.C. Kiryat Gat were promoted from Liga Gimel Central to South B division.

North A Division

North B Division

South A Division

South B Division

Promotion play-offs

North divisions

North A division

Semi-finals

Hapoel Kafr Sumei and Beitar Nahariya advanced to the North A division promotion play-offs final.

Final

Hapoel Kafr Sumei advanced to the North regional final.

North B division

Semi-finals

Hapoel Iksal and Hapoel Ramot Menashe Megido advanced to the North B division promotion play-offs final.

Final

Hapoel Ramot Menashe Megido advanced to the North regional final.

North Regional final

Hapoel Ramot Menashe Megido advanced to the promotion play-off match against Hapoel Bnei Jadeidi from Liga Alef.

Promotion play-off match

Hapoel Ramot Menashe Megido promoted to Liga Alef; Hapoel Bnei Jadeidi relegated to Liga Bet.

South divisions

South A division

Semi-finals

Hapoel Azor and Hapoel Kiryat Ono advanced to the South A division promotion play-offs final.

Final

Hapoel Azor advanced to the South regional final.

South B division

Semi-finals

Ironi Ramla and Moadon Tzeirei Rahat advanced to the South B division promotion play-offs final.

Final

Ironi Ramla advanced to the South Regional final.

South Regional final

Ironi Ramla advanced to the promotion play-off match against Shimshon Bnei Tayibe from Liga Alef.

Promotion play-off match

Shimshon Bnei Tayibe remained in Liga Alef; Ironi Ramla remained in Liga Bet.

Relegation play-offs

North A division

Semi-finals

Beitar Haifa and Hapoel Nahariya remained in Liga Bet. Maccabi Kabul and Maccabi Kafr Sumei qualified for the North A division relegation play-off final.

Final

Maccabi Kafr Sumei remained in Liga Bet. Maccabi Kabul relegated to Liga Gimel.

North B division

Semi-finals

Hapoel Migdal HaEmek and Maccabi Barta'a remained in Liga Bet. Beitar Ihud Mashhad and Hapoel Beit She'an/Mesilot qualified for the North B division relegation play-off final.

Final

Hapoel Beit She'an/Mesilot remained in Liga Bet. Beitar Ihud Mashhad relegated to Liga Gimel.

South A division

Semi-finals

Beitar Petah Tikva and Hapoel Mahane Yehuda remained in Liga Bet. Hapoel F.C. Ortodoxim Jaffa and Otzma F.C. Holon qualified for the South A division relegation play-off final.

Final

Hapoel F.C. Ortodoxim Jaffa remained in Liga Bet. Otzma F.C. Holon relegated to Liga Gimel.

South B division

Semi-finals

Maccabi Sderot and Hapoel Rahat remained in Liga Bet. Maccabi Be'er Ya'akov and Beitar Giv'at Zeev qualified for the South B division relegation play-off final.

Final

Beitar Giv'at Zeev remained in Liga Bet. Maccabi Be'er Ya'akov relegated to Liga Gimel.

References
 The Israel Football Association 
 The Israel Football Association 
 The Israel Football Association 
 The Israel Football Association 

Liga Bet seasons
4
Israel